Hamdullah Nomani is the mayor of Kabul since August 24, 2021, replacing Mohammad Daud Sultanzoy. He has also served the same position during the Islamic Emirate of Afghanistan (1996–2001). Born in Sipayaw village, Andar District, Ghazni Province, Nomani also served as Minister of Higher Education and member of the Leadership council.

In September of 2021, Nomani ordered women civil servants to stay home.

References

Living people
Mayors of Kabul
Taliban leaders
Taliban government ministers of Afghanistan
People from Ghazni Province
21st-century Afghan politicians
Women's rights in Afghanistan
Year of birth missing (living people)